Ted Keenan (1934–24 September 2013) was from Enniskillen in Northern Ireland. He was the first Irish man to swim the English Channel, the North Channel and the Bristol Channel and set a record that still stands as of 2017.

Keenan died in 2013 and a year later was posthumously awarded the Sporting Great accolade at The Impartial Reporter Sport's Awards.

In 2017 his achievements were celebrated with an exhibition at the Fermanagh County Museum from 1 July.

Main Achievements 
 1972 he became the first Irish man to swim the English Channel (18 hours 11 minutes) 
 1973 swam the North Channel (18 hours 27 minutes) 
 1975 swam the Bristol Channel (14 hours 26 minutes) broke the record

Awards 
 2004 Sporting Great accolade at The Impartial Reporter Sport's Awards 
 1984 Inducted in "Marathon Swimming Hall of Fame" Fort Lauderdale, Florida

References 

Male long-distance swimmers
English Channel swimmers